Daniel Eduardo Baldi Alfano (born 23 November 1981) is a Uruguayan former football (soccer) striker who played for Bella Vista in the Primera División Uruguaya. Currently he works as a trainer and has become famous as a writer.

Club career
Baldi had loan spells in the Primera División de México with Cruz Azul and in Italy's Serie B with Treviso.

Writer
Baldi started writing books for children and youth about his passion, soccer, with astounding success.
 2006, La Botella F. C. 9974493781 Fin de Siglo
 2007, La Botella F. C. ¡La 10 a la cancha! 9789974493889 Fin de Siglo 
 2007, El desafío de la montaña. 9789974494107 Fin de Siglo
 2008, La Botella F. C. La 11 se la juega. 9789974494213 Fin de Siglo
 2009, La Botella F. C. El salto a los 12. 9789974494534 Fin de Siglo
 2010, La Botella F.C. El desafío final. Fin de Siglo
 2010, Mi mundial 978-9974-95-376-5  Alfaguara Libro infantil, foreword by Diego Lugano.
 2011, El súper Maxi del gol. Alfaguara
 2012, Los mellis 9789974956018 Alfaguara Libro infantil, foreword by Alejandra Forlán.
 2013, Entre dos pasiones 9789974956971 Alfaguara
 2014, Mi mundial 2 9789974958210  Alfaguara Libro infantil, foreword by Diego Lugano.
 2014, Elige tu propio penal 978-9974-95-824-1 Alfaguara
 2015, Estadio Lleno 9789974958661 Alfaguara
 2016, El muro  9789974959163 loqueleo.

In 2017 a film based on Mi mundial was released.

References

External links 

 

1981 births
Living people
People from Colonia del Sacramento
Uruguayan people of Italian descent
Uruguayan footballers
Uruguayan expatriate footballers
Plaza Colonia players
Cruz Azul footballers
Peñarol players
C.A. Cerro players
Danubio F.C. players
C.A. Bella Vista players
Nueva Chicago footballers
Treviso F.B.C. 1993 players
S.S. Teramo Calcio players
Uruguayan Primera División players
Liga MX players
Serie B players
Expatriate footballers in Argentina
Expatriate footballers in Italy
Expatriate footballers in Mexico
Expatriate footballers in Venezuela
Association football forwards